Rihards Snikus (born 25 March 1988) is a Latvian Paralympic equestrian. He won silver medals at the 2020 Paralympic Games in the Individual freestyle test grade I, and in the Individual championship test grade I.

He competed at the  2017 European Championship in Gothenburg, Sweden, and in the 2018 World Equestrian Games.

References

External links
 

1988 births
Living people
Latvian male equestrians
Paralympic equestrians of Latvia
Paralympic silver medalists for Latvia
Paralympic medalists in equestrian
Equestrians at the 2020 Summer Paralympics
Medalists at the 2020 Summer Paralympics
20th-century Latvian people
21st-century Latvian people